Shenstone Lodge School is a residential special school for children with behaviour or emotional difficulties, in Shenstone, Staffordshire, England, between Lichfield and Sutton Coldfield. It caters for children aged 4–13. It also has a second site in Tividale which caters for children 11-16. It offers day placements and also, where appropriate, home tuition.

Although partly located in Staffordshire, the school is primarily for pupils coming from the Sandwell area.

The school
The school in Shenstone has 4 classrooms for KS1 and 2  of land,a big house where the bedrooms and dining room are and an outdoor swimming pool. The school also has a new sports hall, meeting room and changing rooms that were completed in 2010. It caters for boys and girls with a variety of emotional and behavioural issues. Links have been forged with a number of secondary schools within Sandwell.

The school in Tividale, Oldbury has a number of classrooms, independent living accommodation and an outdoor MUGA and field for physical activity lessons.

Pupils
In Lichfield, Shenstone Lodge boards 5 days a week for boys, Girls and also has day pupils until 3pm.
In Tividale the provision is for the school day.

References

External links
 Shenstone Lodge's website

Special schools in Staffordshire
Lichfield District
Academies in Staffordshire
Special schools in Sandwell
Academies in Sandwell